The Turpan Depression or Turfan Depression, is a fault-bounded trough located around and south of the city-oasis of Turpan, in the Xinjiang Autonomous Region in far Western China, about  southeast of the regional capital Ürümqi. It includes Lake Ayding, the second or third lowest depression on Earth. 
By some measures, it is also the hottest and driest area in China during the summer.

Geology and relief
The Turpan Basin is a fault-bounded trough located in the eastern part of the Tian Shan. The surrounding mountain ranges are: the central Tian Shan in the west, the Bogda Shan in the north-west, the Haerlike Shan in the north-west, and the Jueluotage Shan in the south. Beyond the surrounding mountain ranges lie the Junggar Basin in the north and the Tarim Basin in the south.

Some geographers also use the term Turpan-Hami Basin, which is understood as including the Turpan Depression along with the Hami Depression (located to the east of the Turpan Depression, and to the southwest of the city of Hami) and the Liaodong Uplift separating the two depressions.

The Turpan Basin formed in a shear zone during the Late Permian due to motion between the East European and the Angaran craton. It was subsequently deformed by the collision of the Indian and Eurasian plates in the Cenozoic. In the latter deformation, a thrust fault belt running from east to west, the Flaming Mountains, was formed in the center of the basin. The Turfan volcano is located near Turpan.

It is the lowest surface point in China.

History of human settlement

The ancient city of Gaochang was a key point on the ancient Silk Road and dates back to the 1st century BC. It was burnt down in wars in the 14th century. The caves are famous for their murals, which can still be found in about 40 of the 77 known caves. The desert climate has favored preservation of the content of the Astana-Karakhoja ancient tombs, which are located about 6 km from the ancient city of Gaochang. The tombs are the burial place for nobles, officials, and others who were interred there from the times of the Western Jin dynasty until the middle of the Tang dynasty era.

The modern city of Turpan has a population of 242,000, of whom 71% are Uyghur. The city relies on wells and traditional karez for water.

Climate
The Turpan Basin has a harsh, continental desert climate (Koppen BWk) in which the precipitation is far less than the potential evaporation. The annual average precipitation is only , falling on only 13 days per year. In contrast to this, the potential annual evaporation rate reaches . Because of its climate, the area is sometimes counted as one of the Furnaces of China, although the locations included under this heading vary.

Vegetation and agriculture

On the shores of Aydingkol Lake, reeds, tamarisks, saxauls, as well as other shrubs and weeds can be found. Away from sources of water, the Turpan Basin is not covered by vegetation. Consequently, agriculture is limited to oasis and depends on a sophisticated irrigation system known as the Karez System. The irrigation water comes from the surrounding mountain ranges, in particular from the annual melting of the snow. The Karez System consists of wells, underground channels, ground canals, and small reservoirs, which use the natural slope of the terrain to sustain the water flow and guide the water right to the plants while minimizing evaporation all along the way. The historical record of the system extends back to the Han Dynasty. The Karez System is therefore considered one of the three great ancient projects in China along with the Great Wall and the Grand Canal. Recently, development of groundwater through tubewells has led to a general fall in water tables, and many karez systems have failed. Farming in the Turpan Basin is particularly famous for its fruit. Because of the dry and hot conditions, the fruits grown in the depression have very high concentrations of sugar. They are traditionally processed by drying in open drying barns. The cultivated fruit include: mulberry, peach, apricot, apple, pomegranate, pear, fig, walnut, as well as grapes, watermelons and muskmelons. Among the fruit, the grapes stand out: more than 100 varieties of grape are cultivated in the area and it accounts for 90% of China's seedless grape crop. Other specialty agricultural products of the region are Donghu Hami melons and long-staple cotton.

Sources

Notes

External links
 Climate data
 Travel Article on Chinatoday.com.cn
 Turpan -- Ancient Stop on the Silk Road

Turpan
Landforms of China
Depressions (geology)
Landforms of Xinjiang
Lowest points